is a 1994 video game that was released exclusively in Japan for the Super Famicom. It features the manga series Sailor Moon, Chō Kuse ni Narisō, and Goldfish Warning!, among others.

Summary
This title is about monsters that are attacking the World of Nakayoshi. The monsters are eating up the citizens. The more they eat, the hungrier they get. Four girls must stop the monsters and defeat Daima to save the World of Nakayoshi. The game is an overhead Adventures of Lolo-style puzzle game featuring characters from various Nakayoshi-printed manga. Sailor Moon and Chibi Moon are playable characters. There are also characters from Goldfish Warning!.

Panic in Nakayoshi World has been translated to English.

References

External links
English translation

1994 video games
Action video games
Bandai games
Crossover video games
Japan-exclusive video games
Tom Create games
Super Nintendo Entertainment System games
Super Nintendo Entertainment System-only games
Video games based on anime and manga
Video games developed in Japan
Video games scored by Harumi Fujita
Video games scored by Yasuaki Fujita
Multiplayer and single-player video games
Sailor Moon games